Duran O'Hara Lindblom (born 21 April 1983 in Trollhättan) is a Swedish figure skater. He is the 2003 Swedish silver medalist and 2004 and 2005 bronze medalist.

References
 

1983 births
Living people
People from Trollhättan Municipality
Swedish male single skaters
Swedish people of Irish descent
Sportspeople from Västra Götaland County